Geađgejávri is a lake in the municipality of Kautokeino-Guovdageaidnu in Troms og Finnmark county, Norway. The  lake lies on the Finnmarksvidda plateau, immediately north of the Finland–Norway border, along European route E45.

See also
List of lakes in Norway

References

Kautokeino
Lakes of Troms og Finnmark